Angel Aldan Demapan (born May 27, 1982 in Saipan, Northern Mariana Islands) is a Northern Mariana Islands politician affiliated with the Republican Party.

Early life
Demapan was born on Saipan, Northern Mariana Islands, on May 27, 1982, to Juan Deleon Guerrero Demapan and Rosario Benavente Aldan. His father died from a stroke when he was 11-years old, while his mother suffered paralysis from a stroke a few years later. He received an Associate in Applied Science degree in business administration from Northern Marianas College and studied communications at the University of Hawaii at Manoa.

First CNMI House tenure
Demapan served in the Northern Mariana Islands House of Representatives during the 19th and 20th Commonwealth Legislatures.

2018 United States House of Representatives election
On October 4, 2017, Demapan announced his candidacy for Delegate to the United States House of Representatives in the November 2018 election. He faced incumbent Delegate Gregorio "Killi" Sablan, an independent, in the forthcoming election on November 13, 2018, who won reelection by a wide margin. Between his loss in the 2018 election and his election to the CNMI House in 2020, he was Chief of Staff to Governor Ralph Torres.

Second CNMI House tenure
In the 2020 general election, he was elected to the Northern Mariana Islands House of Representatives. In August 2021, after the passing of Minority Leader Ivan Blanco, Demapan was elected House Minority Leader by his fellow Republicans. In the 2022 general election, Demapan ran for an open seat in the Northern Mariana Islands Senate. He finished third of five candidates for the two open seats, losing to Democratic candidate Celina R. Babauta and Democratic-aligned independent candidate Corina Magofna. After the start of the 23rd Commonwealth Legislature, the predominantly-Republican minority chose Patrick Hofschneider San Nicolas to succeed Demapan as minority leader.

References

1982 births
Living people
Members of the Northern Mariana Islands House of Representatives
People from Saipan
Republican Party (Northern Mariana Islands) politicians